Anca Gabriela Grigoraș (later Mihăilescu, born 8 November 1957) is a retired Romanian artistic gymnast who won team silver medals at the 1976 Olympics and the 1978 World Championships. Individually, she was a European bronze medalist on balance beam in 1973.

She began her training at the Onesti "Flacara" (The Flame) sports club at age 9, and in 1972 moved to CS Dinamo Bucuresti. While at Flacara Onesti, she was twice Romanian national champion, in 1972 and 1973. 

After retiring from competition, Grigoraș coached gymnasts at her native club, Dinamo Bucharest. Since 1990, she has been a national coach and a technical director at the Romanian Gymnastics Federation. She is also an international referee, and has been a member of the UEG Women's Technical Committee. She has received the honors of Master Emeritus of Sport, Trainer Emeritus, and the National Cross for "Faithful Service", II-a class

References

External links

 
 
 
Event Finals results at the 1973 European Championships

Living people
People from Comănești
Romanian female artistic gymnasts
Gymnasts at the 1972 Summer Olympics
Gymnasts at the 1976 Summer Olympics
Olympic gymnasts of Romania
Olympic silver medalists for Romania
Medalists at the World Artistic Gymnastics Championships
1957 births
Olympic medalists in gymnastics
Medalists at the 1976 Summer Olympics
20th-century Romanian women
21st-century Romanian women